Theodora Gkountoura (born 14 March 1997) is a Greek sabre fencer.

She participated at the 2019 World Fencing Championships, winning a bronze medal. She has won the silver medal in the Orléans Grand Prix 2021.

As for the World Cup, she has won the bronze medal in Athens in 2020, the silver medal in Tbilisi in 2022, the bronze medal in Algiers in 2022, and the silver medal in Tashkent in 2023.

So far, she has reached a career highest ranking of 6th place in the 2021-2022 season.

She has been a fencing athlete of AEK multi-sport club, but she's currently an athlete of A.O. Ariston Paianias. She has been 4 times champion in sabre in Greece.

Medal record

World Championship

Grand Prix

World Cup

National Championship

References

External links

1997 births
Living people
Greek female sabre fencers
Fencers at the 2014 Summer Youth Olympics
Competitors at the 2018 Mediterranean Games
Mediterranean Games competitors for Greece
Fencers at the 2020 Summer Olympics
Olympic fencers of Greece
20th-century Greek women
21st-century Greek women